R. N. Kittusamy is an Indian politician from Tamil Nadu. He represents the Anna Dravida Munnetra Kazhagam party. He was the member of the Tamil Nadu Legislative Assembly from the Modakurichi constituency. 

Kittusamy was the chairman of Erode Central Co-operative Bank during 1994-96 and has been secretary of the Erode district unit of the party labour wing since 2006. He has been appointed as Erode (Urban) district AIADMK secretary on 22 December 2013.

References 

Members of the Tamil Nadu Legislative Assembly
All India Anna Dravida Munnetra Kazhagam politicians
Living people
1957 births